Nicole Vandier-Nicolas (24 July 1906 – 1 March 1987), also known as Nicole Nicolas, was a French  sinologist, professor and philosopher. She was specialized in Chinese art and Buddhism.  She was the “first to suggest the connection between the verse written on the one side of the scroll and the pictures on the other side.”

Biography
Nicole Vandier-Nicolas was born as Alberte Émilie Marie Nicole Zoé Vandier on 24 July 1906 in Paris, France. She was a professor of Chinese civilization at the National Institute for Oriental Languages and Civilizations.  She also taught the subject of Chinese art at the École du Louvre. She translated a number of literary works from Chinese to French.

She died on 1 March 1987 in Marcilly-d'Azergues, France.

References

1906 births
1987 deaths
French sinologists
20th-century French historians
Translators from Chinese